The Isabel naked-tailed rat (Solomys sapientis) is a species of rodent in the family Muridae.
It is found only on the island of Santa Isabel in the Solomon Islands.

References

Solomys
Mammals described in 1902
Taxa named by Oldfield Thomas
Taxonomy articles created by Polbot